The Newspaper Association of America Foundation was established in 1961 by the Board of Directors of the American Newspaper Publishers Association. In 1992, the ANPA merged with six other newspaper associations to form the Newspaper Association of America, and the NAA Foundation adopted its current name.

The NAA Foundation is a 501(C)(3) nonprofit organization representing all newspapers equally. There are no requirements for membership, and the Foundation does not collect member dues. All programs offered by the NAA Foundation are supported by an endowment funded by the newspaper industry.

Programs
As outlined in its mission statement, the NAA Foundation recognizes the importance of literacy, civic engagement and a diverse society. Young-reader programs and products focus on academic achievement through youth readership and awareness of the First Amendment. Diversity programs assist news media companies in transforming their workplace culture while growing readership and audience.

The NAA Foundation offers a wide variety of resources, including educational materials, research, best practices, grants, fellowships and training programs.

The central focus of the Foundation includes the following four program areas:
 Newspaper in Education (NIE)
 Youth Editorial Alliance (YEA)
 Student Journalism
 Diversity

Information about NAA Foundation programs can be found at www.naafoundation.org.

See also
Newspaper Association of America

External links
 NAA Foundation Official Website
 Newspaper Association of America Official Website

References

Foundations based in the United States
American journalism organizations